Giustina Demetz (born 27 April 1941) is an Italian former alpine skier who competed at the 1964 and 1968 Winter Olympics in the downhill, slalom and giant slalom events. She failed her slalom races, and finished in 11–14th place in the other two events. Demetz won one downhill stage of the 1967 World Cup (together with Marielle Goitschel) and finished third overall.

References

External links
 

1941 births
Living people
Italian female alpine skiers
Olympic alpine skiers of Italy
Alpine skiers at the 1964 Winter Olympics
Alpine skiers at the 1968 Winter Olympics
Ladin people
People from Santa Cristina Gherdëina
Sportspeople from Südtirol